Alberto Núñez Feijóo (born 10 September 1961) is a Spanish People's Party politician. He currently serves as senator from Galicia and as president of the People's Party. He served as the president of the Regional Government of Galicia from 2009 to 2022. Feijóo is described by the media as a sober, centrist politician. 

Formerly a civil servant, Feijóo was secretary general of Galicia's ministries of agriculture and health before moving to the same role at the national Ministry of Health, and for three years he was President of the State Society of Mail and Telegraphs. Having officially joined the People's Party of Galicia (PPdeG), he entered the Parliament of Galicia in 2005 and succeeded Manuel Fraga as party president the following January. 

In the 2009 Galician regional election, the PPdeG won a majority and Feijóo became regional president. He won further terms in 2012, 2016 and 2020. In 2022, he was confirmed as Pablo Casado's successor as the president of the PP. He resigned his posts in the regional parliament and presidency, and was appointed to the Senate as one of the senators designated by the Galician parliament.

Early life and civil service
Feijóo was born at number 6 Avenida de Mesón in the village of Os Peares near A Peroxa in the Province of Ourense, on 10 September 1961. His father was Saturnino Núñez, a construction foreman, and his mother Sira Feijóo. After graduating in law from the University of Santiago de Compostela in 1984, Núñez Feijóo wanted to become a judge, but his father's unemployment meant that he had to find a job in the civil service to support the family. 

In 1991, he was chosen to be secretary general of the regional Ministry of Agriculture under José Manuel Romay Beccaría. He followed him to the Ministry of Health, first in Galicia and later to the national ministry when Romay was appointed by prime minister José María Aznar. From 2000 to 2003, Feijóo was President of the State Society of Mail and Telegraphs, before returning to regional government as the Minister of Territorial Policy, Public Works and Housing of Galicia.

Political career

Galician politics
Having once voted for the Spanish Socialist Workers' Party (PSOE) under Felipe González, Feijóo did not join the People's Party until 2002. After his role in the national health service, the President of the Community of Madrid, Esperanza Aguirre, wanted him to lead the same ministry in her region. 

In 2005, Manuel Fraga of the People's Party of Galicia was removed from office after 15 years as President of the Regional Government of Galicia (PPdeG), when the Socialists' Party of Galicia (PSdeG) and the Galician Nationalist Bloc (BNG) formed a coalition to install Emilio Pérez Touriño in his place. At the congress to name Fraga's successor in January 2006, he prevented a divide by persuading leading candidates Feijóo and José Manuel Barreiro to run in tandem as candidates for the party's president and vice president respectively, thereby taking 96% of the vote.

In the 2009 Galician regional election, the PPdeG's share of seats rose from 37 to 38, thereby giving them an absolute majority of one. In April, he was invested as president by the 8th legislature. He won a second term in the 2012 Galician regional election, which he had called early. Despite receiving over 100,000 votes fewer than in 2009, his party gained three seats due to reduced turnout. In March 2013, members of the opposition called for his resignation after photographs from the mid-1990s were published of him with Marcial Dorado, who was later convicted as a drug dealer. Feijóo said that at the time, he had no knowledge of Dorado's criminal lifestyle.

Feijóo retained his majority in 2016 and 2020, the latter time increasing to 42 seats. He was tipped to run to succeed Mariano Rajoy as national PP leader in 2018 but turned it down, crying while declaring that being President of Galicia was his highest ambition. He resigned as president of the PPdeG effective from 1 April 2022 to take over the post in the national party.

President of the People's Party
In March 2022, the 20th National Congress of the People's Party was called to elect a new national party leader after the forced ousting of incumbent Pablo Casado, who had been losing support following a dispute with the President of the Community of Madrid, Isabel Díaz Ayuso. Feijóo put himself forward as a candidate, and was endorsed by regional PP leaders such as Ayuso, Jorge Azcón (Aragon), Alfonso Fernández Mañueco (Castile and León) and Juan Manuel Moreno (Andalusia). He ran unopposed as the only other prospective candidate, a 28-year-old local activist from Valencia, did not have enough verified signatures. He named the party's spokesperson in the Congress of Deputies, Cuca Gamarra, as the party's new Secretary General.

During Feijóo's candidacy, the PP formed a government with Vox in the Cortes of Castile and León. He endorsed the coalition, but said that he would not repeat it on the national level: "sometimes it's better to lose government than win it through populism". As party president, Feijóo halted his predecessor's plans to sell the party headquarters on Calle de Génova.

On 24 May 2022, Feijóo was elected by the Parliament of Galicia as senator for the region, for which he resigned his seat in the Parliament of Galicia.

Political positions

Feijóo has defined himself as a reformist of the centre-right and as a liberal. While his allies have praised him for moderation, opposing parties disputed these labels due to his endorsement of the PP/Vox pact in Castile and León.

Under Feijóo in 2009, the PPdeG dropped its support for the Galician language, which had been supported by his predecessor and founder of the PP, Manuel Fraga. In 2019, it was reported that Galician was now mandatory for all teacher candidates in the region, though Feijóo had personally said that knowledge of it would be desired but not mandatory. This policy put him against a proposal by national PP leader Pablo Casado, in which no public job would require knowledge of a regional language. During the congress in which he was confirmed as PP president, he declared their language policy to be one of "cordial bilingualism".

In 2011, Feijóo suggested that hospital patients should pay for non-medical service such as food and showers during their stay, and the following year he suggested privatising all that is not at the "core" of healthcare. In 2013, he said that healthcare would not be privatised under his government.

Feijóo is a close friend and ally of Iñigo Urkullu, the President of the Basque Country from the Basque Nationalist Party (EAJ-PNV). The pair first found common ground in 2013 when they defended their shipyards before the European Union. While Pablo Casado opposed further devolution to the Basque Country, Feijóo has been more sympathetic.

Personal life
A 2009 profile of Feijóo by El País noted that his personal life and spending habits were more austere than those of the previous regional president, Touriño. Feijóo was in a relationship with the journalist Carmen Gámir from 2000 to 2012. Since 2013 he has been in a relationship with Zara Home director Eva Cárdenas, who gave birth to his only child, also named Alberto, in February 2017. Feijóo is known as an admirer of Galician cuisine and a supporter of the football club Deportivo de La Coruña.

Honours 
 Order of Isabella the Catholic, Grand Cross, 28 October 2002
 Order of Prince Henry, Grand Cross, 9 June 2015
 Order of the Rising Sun, 3rd Class, Gold Rays with Neck Ribbon

See also
Xunta de Galicia

References

|-

|-

|-

|-

1961 births
Living people
Members of the 7th Parliament of Galicia
Members of the 8th Parliament of Galicia
Members of the 9th Parliament of Galicia
Members of the 10th Parliament of Galicia
Members of the 14th Senate of Spain
People from Ourense (comarca)
People's Party (Spain) politicians
Presidents of the Regional Government of Galicia
Recipients of the Order of the Rising Sun, 3rd class
University of Santiago de Compostela alumni